Live at the Orpheum is a live album by the band King Crimson, released by Discipline Global Mobile records in 2015.  The album was recorded on 30 September and 1 October at the Orpheum Theatre in Los Angeles, California on the band's The Elements of King Crimson US tour of 2014.

King Crimson's 2014 tour marked guitarist, founder and leader Robert Fripp's return to active service after a long legal battle with Universal Music Group. This line-up of King Crimson is notable for featuring three drummers, Pat Mastelloto, Gavin Harrison and Bill Rieflin. The other members of the band are long standing bass player Tony Levin, Mel Collins who was previously in the band from 1970 to 1972, also playing on Red in 1974, Jakko Jakszyk on guitar and vocals, and Robert Fripp.

All the shows on the tour were recorded on multitrack with Jakko Jakszyk sorting through the recordings. The two shows at the Orpheum Theatre in Los Angeles were chosen for release. The album features 41 minutes of selections from the set and was released on 13 January 2015 on CD/DVD-A and heavy-weight vinyl.

Track listing

Other songs performed through the two shows but not included in either release: "Larks' Tongues in Aspic, Parts One and Two" (Fripp, Bruford, Wetton, Cross, Jamie Muir; Fripp), "VROOOM/Coda: Marine 475" (Fripp, Bruford, Levin, Belew, Mastelotto, Gunn), "A Scarcity of Miracles" (Fripp, Collins, Levin, Harrison, Jakko Jakszyk), "Pictures of a City" (Fripp, Sinfield), "Level Five" (Fripp, Belew, Gunn, Mastelotto), "Red" (Fripp), "The Talking Drum" (Fripp, Bruford, Wetton, Cross, Muir), "Hell Hounds of Krim" (Mastelotto, Harrison, Bill Rieflin), "21st Century Schizoid Man" (Michael Giles, Fripp, Ian McDonald, Sinfield, Greg Lake), and "The Light of Day" (Fripp, Collins, Levin, Harrison, Jakszyk).

Personnel
King Crimson
Front Line
 Pat Mastelotto – drums, electronic drums, percussion
 Bill Rieflin – drums, electronic drum, percussion, synthesizer, backing vocals
 Gavin Harrison – drums, percussion, mixing
Back Line
 Mel Collins – saxophones, flutes
 Tony Levin – bass, extended-range bass, electric upright bass, Chapman Stick, funk fingers, backing vocals, photography (cover and road photos)
 Jakko Jakszyk – guitar, vocals, mixing, production engineering
 Robert Fripp – guitar, guitar synth, keyboards, Soundscapes, mixing

Production
 Mark Vreeken – live recording engineer
 John Dent (Live Mastering) – mastering (vinyl version)
 Neil Wilkes (Opus Productions) – DVD authoring (CD/DVD-A version)
 Scarlet Page – photography (back cover photo)
 Ben Singleton – "Elements" logos
 Hugh O'Donnell – design and layout

Charts

References

External links
Tony Levin's diary entry for the shows

2015 live albums
King Crimson live albums
Discipline Global Mobile albums